Gian Vincenzo Moreni (29 January 1932 – 3 March 1999) was an Italian prelate of the Catholic Church who worked in the diplomatic service of the Holy See. He was made an archbishop in 1982 and served as Apostolic Nuncio from 1982 to 1999.

Biography
Gian Vincenzo Moreni was born in Montichiari, Italy, on 29 January 1932. He was ordained a priest of the Diocese of Brescia on 4 April 1959. He earned doctorates in theology and canon law, a degree in civil law and licentiates in philosophy and moral theology.

To prepare for a diplomatic career he entered the Pontifical Ecclesiastical Academy in 1961. He entered the diplomatic service in 1963.

On 29 April 1982, Pope John Paul II appointed him titular archbishop of Turris in Mauretania and Apostolic Nuncio to Tanzania. He received his episcopal consecration on 5 June 1982 from Cardinal Agostino Casaroli.

On 8 September 1990, Pope John Paul II named him Apostolic Nuncio to the Philippines.

He died in Montichiari on 3 March 1999 and being treated for cancer for several months.

A street in Montichiari, Via Monsignor Vescovo Gianvincenzo Moreni, is named for him.

References

External links
Catholic Hierarchy: Archbishop Gian Vincenzo Moreni 

1932 births
1999 deaths
Religious leaders from the Province of Brescia
Pontifical Ecclesiastical Academy alumni
Apostolic Nuncios to Tanzania
Apostolic Nuncios to the Philippines